The Speaker of the Victorian Legislative Assembly is the presiding officer of the Victorian Legislative Assembly, the lower house of the Parliament of Victoria. The presiding officer of the upper house of the Parliament of Victoria, the Victorian Legislative Council, is the President of the Victorian Legislative Council.

A Speaker is elected at the beginning of each new parliamentary term by the Legislative Assembly from one of its members. The Assembly may re-elect an incumbent Speaker by passing a motion; otherwise, a secret ballot is held. The Assembly can dismiss the Speaker by a majority vote, and the Speaker can resign.

In practice, the Speaker is usually a member of the governing party or parties, who have the majority in the Assembly. The Speaker continues to be a member of a political party, and may or may not attend party meetings. The Speaker also continues to carry out ordinary electorate duties as a member of Parliament and must take part in an election campaign to be re-elected as a member of Parliament.

The Deputy Speaker, also elected by the Assembly, supports and assists the Speaker and fulfils the role as Speaker in their absence or during a vacancy in the position.

Speakers of the Victorian Legislative Assembly

References

Victoria